Melvin Anthony Anderson (born August 29, 1965) is a former professional American football wide receiver in the National Football League (NFL).

External links
NFL.com profile

1965 births
Living people
American football wide receivers
Pittsburgh Steelers players
Minnesota Golden Gophers football players
University of Minnesota alumni
National Football League replacement players